The 2004–05 Alpha Ethniki was the 69th season of the highest football league of Greece. The season began on 18 September 2004 and ended on 25 May 2005. Olympiacos won their 33rd Greek title.

Teams

Stadia and personnel

 1 On final match day of the season, played on 25 May 2005.

League table

Results

Top scorers
Source: Galanis Sports Data

External links
Official Greek FA Site
Greek SuperLeague official Site
SuperLeague Statistics

Alpha Ethniki seasons
Greece
1